Gelalak or Galalak, sometimes also transliterated as Galalag may refer to:
 Galalak, Andika
 Gelalak (32°21′ N 49°47′ E), Andika
 Gelalak (32°23′ N 49°43′ E), Andika